Logroño Railway Station  is the central railway station of Logroño, Spain. Commonly referred locally as the RENFE station, the station is part of Adif and high-speed rail systems.

Services

The station accommodates RENFE long-distance and medium-distance trains (AVE).

References 

Railway stations in Spain opened in 1863
Railway stations located underground in Spain
Logroño